Mario Szegedy (born October 23, 1960) is a Hungarian-American computer scientist, professor of computer science at Rutgers University. He received his Ph.D. in computer science in 1989 from the University of Chicago. He held a Lady Davis Postdoctoral Fellowship at the Hebrew University, Jerusalem (1989–90), a postdoc at the University of Chicago, 1991–92, and a postdoc at Bell Laboratories (1992).

Szegedy's research areas include computational complexity theory and quantum computing.

He was awarded the Gödel Prize twice, in 2001 and 2005, for his work on probabilistically checkable proofs and on the space complexity of approximating the frequency moments in streamed data.  His work on streaming was also recognized by the 2019 Paris Kanellakis Theory and Practice Award.

He is married and has two daughters.

References

External links
 Home page

1960 births
Living people
Hungarian emigrants to the United States
Hungarian computer scientists
20th-century Hungarian mathematicians
21st-century Hungarian mathematicians
Gödel Prize laureates
Rutgers University faculty
University of Chicago alumni
Theoretical computer scientists